Debra Steidel Wall is an American archivist serving as the acting archivist of the United States, the head of the National Archives and Records Administration.

Education 
Wall earned a Bachelor of Arts degree in history and government from Georgetown University and a Master of Arts in film from the American University.

Career 
Wall began her career at the National Archives in 1991 as an archivist trainee with a specialty in film. She served as the agency's chief of staff of the National Archives from 2008 to 2011. Wall became deputy archivist in July 2011, the second highest position at the agency.

In 2018, she was appointed to the Women’s Suffrage Centennial Commission.

On May 1, 2022, Wall became acting archivist upon the retirement of David Ferriero.

In 2023, Wall was named in a lawsuit filed against her and others including National Archives security guards for alleged civil rights violations under the first and fifth amendments. The individuals who filed the lawsuit claimed in the suit that they were asked to remove attire with "pro-life" slogans.

References

American University alumni
Georgetown College (Georgetown University) alumni
Living people
National Archives and Records Administration
Year of birth missing (living people)